The governor of Arunachal Pradesh is a nominal head and representative of the president of India in the state of Arunachal Pradesh. The governor is appointed by the president for a term of five years. The current governor is Kaiwalya Trivikram Parnaik.

Powers and functions

The governor enjoys many different types of powers:

Executive powers related to administration, appointments and removals,
Legislative powers related to lawmaking and the state legislature, that is Vidhan Sabha or Vidhan Parishad, and
Discretionary powers to be carried out according to the discretion of the Governor.

List of chief commissioners of Arunachal Pradesh

List of lieutenant governors of Arunachal Pradesh

List of governors of Arunachal Pradesh
Data from Arunachal Pradesh Governor's Secretariat and Directorate of Information & Public Relations, Government of Arunachal Pradesh

References

External links
 Home : Official website of the Governor of Arunachal Pradesh, India

 
Arunachal Pradesh
Governors